Grand Plaza, also known as Grand Tower, is a building in Mong Kok, Kowloon, Hong Kong.

External links
 

Commercial buildings in Hong Kong
Mong Kok